Melanie Janine Brown  (born 29 May 1975), commonly known as Mel B or Melanie B, is an English singer, songwriter, television personality, and actress. She rose to fame in the 1990s as a member of the girl group Spice Girls, in which she was nicknamed Scary Spice. With over 100 million records sold worldwide, the group became the best-selling female group of all time. 

During the Spice Girls hiatus, Mel B released her debut solo album, Hot (2000), with its lead single, "I Want You Back", reaching number one on the UK Singles Chart. Other singles from the album, such as "Tell Me" and "Feels So Good", both reached the top 5 in the UK charts. She released her second solo album, L.A. State of Mind (2005), which spawned the hit single, "Today". Mel B released "For Once in My Life" in 2013, her first single in eight years; it peaked at number 2 on the Billboard Hot Dance Club Songs chart.

Since 2007, Mel B has established herself as a television personality and talent show judge. She participated in the fifth season of the American dance competition series Dancing with the Stars (2007), finishing in second place with her professional partner, Maksim Chmerkovskiy. Between 2011 and 2016, Mel B served as a guest and main judge on the Australian and British versions of The X Factor. She also co-presented the Australian version of Dancing with the Stars for one season (2012). Mel B judged on the NBC reality show America's Got Talent (2013–2018), served as a coach and mentor on The Voice Kids Australia (2014) and judged on The Masked Singer Australia (2022). From 2016 to 2018, she co-presented Lip Sync Battle UK alongside rapper Professor Green.

Early life
Melanie Janine Brown was born in Hyde Park, Leeds, and grew up in the Kirkstall area of the city, the daughter of Andrea and Martin Brown. Her father is from Saint Kitts and Nevis and her mother is British. Through her mother, Brown is a first cousin of actor and director Christian Cooke; Cooke's mother, Di, and Brown's mother, Andrea, are sisters. Brown studied performing arts at Intake High School in Bramley, Leeds before entering the entertainment industry. For a time, she worked as a dancer in Blackpool, Lancashire.

Career

1994–2000: Spice Girls

In 1994, Brown, along with Mel C, Geri Halliwell and Victoria Adams responded to an advertisement in The Stage magazine. Around 400 women who answered the advertisement attended auditions at Danceworks Studios in Mayfair, London. Halliwell, Chisholm, Adams, Brown, and Michelle Stephenson were originally chosen as the members of the group which was known as Touch. When Stephenson left she was replaced by Emma Bunton. 

The group felt insecure about the lack of a contract and were frustrated by the direction in which Heart Management was going and broke with them. In 1995, they toured record labels in London and Los Angeles and after teaming up with music manager Simon Fuller they signed a deal with Virgin Records and the group name was changed to Spice Girls. Their debut album, Spice, was a huge worldwide commercial success, peaked at number one in more than 17 countries, and was certified multi-platinum in 27 countries. The album centred on the idea of "Girl Power", and was compared to Beatlemania. In total the album sold 30 million copies worldwide and became the biggest-selling album in music history by a girl group and one of the most successful albums of all time. The first single, "Wannabe", reached number one in 37 countries and all the following singles – "Say You'll Be There", "2 Become 1", "Who Do You Think You Are" and "Mama" – also peaked at number one in United Kingdom.

In 1997, they released their second album, Spiceworld, and their first two singles "Spice Up Your Life" and "Too Much", entered the UK Albums Chart at number one, making seven consecutive number one hit singles, an all-time record for a musical group. The album was a global best seller, selling 20 million copies worldwide. The group also starred in their own film, Spiceworld: The Movie, which grossed $100 million worldwide. The next single, "Stop", peaked at two, breaking the sequence of number ones. "Viva Forever", another number one, was the last single before Halliwell's departure from the group in May 1998. As a four-piece, the group released "Goodbye" in late 1998. It topped the UK Singles Chart and became their third consecutive Christmas number-one – equaling the record previously set by The Beatles. Before the split of the Spice Girls, Brown went on to release music with Virgin Records, the label she was signed to when a member of the Spice Girls. "I Want You Back" charted at number 1 on the UK Singles Chart, and also had success around the globe. The song was recorded for the soundtrack of the film Why Do Fools Fall in Love. The single sold 218,000 copies and became the 82nd Bestselling British Single of the year.

1999–2004: Hot and acting

In 1999, while recording her album, Brown worked with producers such as Sisqó, Teddy Riley, and Jimmy Jam and Terry Lewis (Janet Jackson, Prince), with whom she was also working on the Spice Girls' third album, Forever. At the suggestion of her then-husband Jimmy Gulzar, Brown covered Cameo's 1986 hit "Word Up" as her next solo release. The track was already released on the soundtrack to Austin Powers: The Spy Who Shagged Me. The song charted poorly, peaking at fourteen on the UK Singles Chart making it the lowest-charting Spice Girls-related single of the 90s. Turning to television work, she hosted Pure Naughty, a weekly BBC2 magazine show focusing on black music. She also hosted the MOBO Awards on two occasions, in 1998 with Bill Bellamy and in 1999 with Wyclef Jean, and took part in a BBC-funded short film entitled Fish. She hosted a number of TV shows such as This Is My Moment (a talent show) for ITV1 and shot a documentary called Voodoo Princess for Channel 4. She took part in smaller projects as a presenter such as Top of the Pops, Party in the Park for The Prince's Trust and The All Star Animal Awards. She has appeared as herself in an advert for the Yorkshire tourist board in a series which included contributions from other Yorkshire-born celebrities, and in the film Happy Birthday Oscar Wilde.

Brown's debut album, Hot was released in October 2000, a month before the final Spice Girls album, Forever was released. Following the release of Forever, which was far less successful than their previous two albums, the Spice Girls stopped recording and the members began investing more time into their solo careers. The lead single from Hot, "Tell Me", debuted at No. 4 in the UK charts with about 40,000 copies sold in its first week of release. It sold approximately 100,000 copies, making it the 158th "best seller" of 2000. Further singles were released in February 2001; "Feels So Good" which had peaked at No. 5, followed by a "Lullaby", a pop number dedicated to her daughter. It was accompanied by a video shot in Morocco and featured Brown with Phoenix Chi. The media criticised Brown for using her child in the music video and single artwork, labeling her Desperate Spice and insinuating that she was exploiting her child as a marketing tool. The single entered and peaked at No. 13. The album was not a success and garnered mediocre reviews, selling a disappointing 7,419 copies in its first week and charting at a weak No. 28 leading to Virgin dumping Brown from their label. In 2002, Brown released her autobiography, Catch a Fire, which reached No. 7 in the official books chart, and saw her touring the UK to promote it with a run of book signings. In 2003 Brown's first movie role came in the form of a British drama, Burn It. She appeared in a horror film entitled, LD 50 Lethal Dose, which was released directly to DVD in 2005. She acted in a long run of shows as part of the cast for The Vagina Monologues. She was in the movie The Seat Filler, co-produced by Will Smith and starring Destiny's Child star Kelly Rowland. In April 2004, Brown was approached to take part in the musical Rent as Mimi Marquez In Netherlands.

2005–2008: L.A. State of Mind and Spice Girls reunion

After Rent, Brown became interested in recording new songs. Since her breakup with Virgin in 2001, she remained distant from music, not interested in a return. She had a leading role in the thriller Telling Lies, and decided to release them a year later through an independent label, Amber Café. The only single from the album, "Today", saw a UK release in June 2005. "Today" entered the singles chart at No. 41, selling around 1,000 copies in its first week. The album, LA State of Mind, was released on 27 June 2005 in two formats: as a regular CD and as a limited edition with a 30-minute DVD documentary detailing Brown's life in Los Angeles. In a scathing review, AllMusic stated that this album was one of the worst pop albums of the decade. The album was also released with a bonus DVD featuring an in-depth documentary filmed and directed by Mark McConnell. Brown said she did not sign with a major label because the album was a non-commercial project. She also shied away from recording in an R&B or hip hop style again, instead focusing on using adult themes and rhythms such as in acoustic music following an appearance in the film Love Thy Neighbor.

In September 2007, Brown joined the fifth season of the US television dance competition, Dancing with the Stars with her partner Maksim Chmerkovskiy. On 27 November 2007, they took second place in the show, losing to Hélio Castroneves and his partner, Julianne Hough. That year, the Spice Girls re-grouped and announced plans for a reunion tour, from which they were said to have earned £10 million each (approximately $20 million). The band said that they are still enjoying doing their "own thing". The group decided to release their first compilation album, Greatest Hits, in early November 2007 and the tour began on 2 December 2007. During one Spice Girls performance at London's The O2 Arena, the band's children, including Brown's children accompanied her on stage during "Mama", along with the other Spice Girls' children. During the reformation filmmaker Bob Smeaton directed an official film of the tour entitled Spice Girls: Giving You Everything. As well as their sell-out tour, the Spice Girls were contracted to appear in Tesco advertisements, for which they were paid £1 million each.

2009–2018: Television and other projects

In April 2009, Brown joined actress and former Dancing with the Stars champion Kelly Monaco as original stars of a Las Vegas revue called Peepshow at the Las Vegas Planet Hollywood Hotel and Casino. On 17 August 2009, Brown was announced as a visiting panellist on ITV1's daily lunchtime show Loose Women. She appeared for a week of shows during September 2009. In January 2010, Brown was selected to replace Marissa Jaret Winokur as the new host of Oxygen's weight loss show Dance Your Ass Off. In September 2010, her own reality show aired on the Style Network called Mel B: It's a Scary World. In November 2010, the virtual computer game Get Fit with Mel B, was released in North America and Europe. Brown served as a celebrity mentor on the second season of the Australian version of The X Factor during week 8 of the live shows in 2010. During the results show, she performed a duet with the remaining five acts singing "Stop" originally by the Spice Girls. 

In April 2011, it was announced that Brown would replace Kyle Sandilands as a judge for the third series of the Australian version of The X Factor alongside Ronan Keating, Guy Sebastian and fellow new judge Natalie Bassingthwaighte (who replaced Natalie Imbruglia). For her first series on the show, she was given the Girls category. In February 2012, Brown was announced to replace Sonia Kruger as co-host on the Australian version of Dancing with the Stars. In February of that year, rumours circled of a Spice Girls reunion. Brown revealed that the band were working on some projects for later in the year, including a musical featuring their back catalogue. 
On 31 March, it was announced that Brown signed a global partnership with EMI Music Australia for the release of her third studio album, but she later broke from the contract.

Brown returned for the fourth series of The X Factor and mentored the Boys category. Her act Jason Owen reached the final, but finished in second place after losing out to Samantha Jade, mentored by Guy Sebastian. In June 2012, it was confirmed that Brown would become a guest judge for the Manchester auditions of the British version of The X Factor alongside Louis Walsh, Gary Barlow and Tulisa Contostavlos.

In July 2012, Brown reunited with the Spice Girls for a one-off performance at the 2012 Summer Olympics Closing Ceremony in London, performing a medley of their hits "Wannabe" and "Spice Up Your Life". The performance was the most tweeted moment of the entire Olympics with over 116,000 tweets on Twitter per minute. Later in the year, the Spice Girls reunited again to launch and attend the premiere of Viva Forever!. In addition to the promotion of the musical, the group appeared in the documentary, Spice Girls' Story: Viva Forever! which aired on 24 December 2012 on ITV1.

In March 2013 it was confirmed that Brown would judge Australia's Got Talent along with Dawn French. The same month, it was confirmed that Brown would not return as a judge for the fifth season of The X Factor due to her commitments with Australia's Got Talent. Brown was replaced by Dannii Minogue. On 9 April 2013, the Australian Associated Press reported that Brown was off the chain and banned from judging on Australia's Got Talent after Seven, the Australian TV network that airs The X Factor, filed suit to prevent Brown from appearing on any rival networks. The judge ruled that Brown was still under contract with Seven until January 2014, thus preventing her from appearing on a program aired by another network until after that date. The Nine Network confirmed rumours on 29 April that they had hired Halliwell to replace Brown.

She had a small part in the final episode of the ITV2 drama series Secret Diary of a Call Girl. In 2013, she returned to acting in the Lifetime movie Twelve Trees of Christmas. From August to September 2013, she became a judge on the televised dancing show, Stepping Out, alongside choreographers Wayne Sleep and Jason Gardiner. That month, Brown released her first single in eight years, "For Once in My Life", from her untitled and unreleased third studio album. The single peaked at No.2 on the Billboard Hot Dance Club Songs charts.

On 20 February 2013, NBC had announced that Brown would be a judge on America's Got Talent for its eighth season, alongside Howie Mandel, Howard Stern, fellow new judge Heidi Klum, and eventually Simon Cowell, who replaced Stern in 2016. Brown had replaced Sharon Osbourne. She judged seasons 8 through 13, and the first season of America's Got Talent: The Champions before her departure was announced in February 2019 and replaced by Gabrielle Union. In late 2014, she appeared on The Big Fat Quiz of the Year and a sketch with the cast of Coronation Street for charity telethon Text Santa.

Early 2014, Brown become a coach on the Australian version of The Voice Kids, alongside singers Joel Madden and Delta Goodrem. In June, she was confirmed as the fourth judge for the eleventh series of the British version of The X Factor, replacing Nicole Scherzinger. Emma Bunton joined her in Cancun, Mexico for the judges' houses stage of The X Factor.
In December 2014, it was announced that Brown would miss The X Factor final due to illness. In the same year, Brown became a guest co-host on the Breakfast program of Sydney radio station 2Day FM, alongside Jules Lund, Merrick Watts and Sophie Monk. Brown's and co-hosts replaced top hosts Kyle and Jackie O who moved to a rival station.

On 16 June 2015, it was confirmed that she would not return for the twelfth series of The X Factor and was replaced by Rita Ora. She began presenting Lip Sync Battle UK, the British adaption of Lip Sync Battle, on Channel 5 in January 2016, alongside Professor Green.

In 2016, Brown guest judged at The X Factor at the London auditions, standing in for Scherzinger, while she had other commitments. In 2016 she announced that the Spice Girls – except for Victoria Beckham and Melanie C – were working on new material and a 20th anniversary tour for 2017. The song "Song for Her" was later leaked online featuring the bandmembers. Plans for a reunion were dropped when Halliwell announced she was expecting her second child. Brown also confirmed her return to The X Factor Australia replacing Minogue, after a three-year absence. As only three categories were announced, she got a new category, Underdogs, where she chose an eliminated act from each of their categories to bring back to form a new category. In 2017 she returned to Broadway to star in the musical Chicago as Roxie Hart. Around the same time, she returned to acting in the movie Chocolate City: Vegas Strip guestarring Robert Ri'chard, Michael Jai White, Mekhi Phifer, Vivica A. Fox and Ginuwine. The same month, she had made a cameo in the movie Killing Hasselhoff guest-starring David Hasselhoff and Justin Bieber. In late 2017, Brown had a cameo in the music video for "Spice Girl" by Aminé.

2018–present: Second Spice Girls reunion and Trailblazers
On 5 November 2018, Brown announced the Spice Girls reunion tour on her Instagram profile. It was confirmed that Brown and ex-bandmates Chisholm, Bunton and Halliwell—but not Beckham, whom Brown dressed as for Halloween the previous week — would return for a 13-date UK and Ireland stadium tour Spice World - 2019 Tour, their first for a decade.

In 2021, Brown appeared on the second series of The Masked Singer as "Seahorse" and finished in 11th place. In May 2021, Brown collaborated with Fabio D'Andrea in his short music film, "Love Should Not Hurt", in support of Women's Aid. In 2021, she also appeared on the Spanish version of The Masked Singer as "Medusa" and finished in ninth place. Mel B later appeared on the panel of fourth season of the Australian version of The Masked Singer as a replacement for Dannii Minogue.

Brown was appointed Member of the Order of the British Empire (MBE) in the 2022 New Year Honours for services to charitable causes and vulnerable women. Brown was also appointed as a tourism ambassador from the United Kingdom to Nevis in 2022. She was also selected to replace Leona Lewis as a judge on the Paramount+ reality series Queen of the Universe.

In November 2022, Brown presented Trailblazers: A Rocky Mountain Road Trip alongside Ruby Wax and Emily Atack. The BBC documentary follows in the footsteps of Victorian explorer Isabella Bird, who travelled on her own for hundreds of miles across the American Wild West. The three-part series debuts on 28 November 2022. In December 2022, she had starred in the Christmas TV A New Diva’s Christmas Carol, alongside Ashanti and Vivica A. Fox.

Personal life
From 1996 to 1997, Brown dated the Icelandic businessman Fjölnir Thorgeirsson. 

In March 1998, she began a relationship with the Dutch dancer Jimmy Gulzar while on the Spiceworld Tour. They became engaged on 13 May 1998, Brown became pregnant that June, and the couple were married in Little Marlow, Buckinghamshire, on 13 September 1998. Brown changed her stage name to Melanie G while they were married. Their daughter, Phoenix Chi Gulzar, was born on 19 February 1999. Brown filed for divorce in 2000, and the divorce was finalised later that year. Brown won custody, and paid a settlement of £1.25m to Gulzar. Gulzar was prosecuted for threatening Brown and attacking her sister Danielle. In August 2001, Gulzar was found guilty of the assault, but later cleared by the court.

From 2000 to 2002, Brown was in a relationship with actor Max Beesley. From 2002 to 2006, she was in a relationship with the film producer Christine Crokos. Brown and Crokos lived together in Los Angeles, California. Speaking to Gay Star News about the relationship, she said: 'It wasn't experimentation. I fell in love with a woman for five years. An experiment doesn't last five years.' Asked about the relationship, Brown said: "People call me lesbian, bisexual or heterosexual, but I know who's in my bed and that's it. I have a huge libido and a great sex life." Brown and Crokos's relationship ended in 2006. Brown said that she had had a four-year relationship with a woman when she was in her teens. 

In a 2019 interview with Piers Morgan, Brown was asked if she had slept with Halliwell in an intimate manner and she nodded yes. Halliwell released a statement denying this, saying Brown's claim had been "hurtful to her family". Brown later said: "I just said it was like a little thing and we giggled about it the next day and that’s that. It's the press [who] have taken it onto a whole new level."

Brown became the subject of tabloid stories during her relationship with the Hollywood actor Eddie Murphy, who fathered Brown's second child, Angel Iris Murphy Brown, born 3 April 2007. By early December 2006, Brown and Murphy had separated. Murphy told a journalist that the parentage of Brown's unborn baby could not be proven until a paternity test was performed. On 22 June 2007, a court-ordered DNA test confirmed that Murphy was the child's father. Murphy admitted paternity and indicated that he and Brown had reached a paternity settlement of $7 million.

In February 2007, Brown began dating the film producer Stephen Belafonte. They secretly married on 6 June 2007 in Las Vegas. They renewed their vows in front of their families on 8 November 2008 in Hurghada, Egypt. On 1 September 2011, Brown gave birth to her third daughter, Madison Brown Belafonte. Brown and Belafonte separated in December 2016. Brown filed for divorce in March 2017, and accused Belafonte of emotional and physical abuse. In court, Belafonte's representative said that due to the couple's "extravagant and affluent" lifestyle, Brown had "wiped out all her Spice Girls money – approximately $50 million (£38.3 million), if not more". The divorce was finalised on 15 December 2017. Brown cited her divorce from Belafonte and her father's death as her reasons for seeking treatment for PTSD. In November 2018, Brown became a patron of the domestic violence survivors' charity Women's Aid.

In December 2018, Brown fell, breaking several of her ribs and suffering a serious cut to her hand, for which she underwent emergency surgery. In 2019, Brown revealed she has been diagnosed with anxiety, dyspraxia, dyslexia, and ADHD. In October 2022, Brown announced she was engaged to Rory McPhee. It is thought the pair have been in a relationship since 2018.

Discography

 Hot (2000)
 L.A. State of Mind (2005)

Filmography

Television

Films

Theatre credits

Bibliography
 Brown, Melanie. (2002). Catch a Fire: The Autobiography. Headline Book Publishing. 
Brown, Melanie. (2018). Brutally Honest. Quadrille Publishing Ltd.

References

External links

  
 

 
1975 births
20th-century Black British women singers
21st-century Black British women singers
Bisexual singers
Bisexual songwriters
Bisexual dancers
Bisexual women
Black British women rappers
Black British actresses
British contemporary R&B singers
British hip hop singers
Dance-pop musicians
English dance musicians
English expatriates in Australia
English expatriates in the United States
English women pop singers
English women rappers
English women singer-songwriters
English people of Saint Kitts and Nevis descent
Feminist musicians
LGBT Black British people
English LGBT singers
English LGBT songwriters
English bisexual people
Living people
Musicians from Leeds
Participants in American reality television series
People from Harehills
People from Burley, Leeds
Spice Girls members
Virgin Records artists
Women television personalities
20th-century English LGBT people
21st-century English LGBT people
Members of the Order of the British Empire
Women autobiographers
People with attention deficit hyperactivity disorder
Musicians with dyslexia
Actors with dyslexia
People with dyslexia